was a large Japanese retailer and distributor, best known outside Japan as the company that revived the Plaubel Makina 67 camera in the late 1970s and early 1980s.

Its roots go back to Doi Shōten, also referred to as Doi Shōkai. This was a Japanese retailer, distributor, or both, that started in 1949. (Doi here is a surname, shōten means "retailer", and shōkai means "trading company".) In the early fifties it was based in Osaka.

Kimio Doi (Doi Kimio), son of the Mr. Doi of Doi Shōten, started a branch in Fukuoka at some time around 1956. In 1959 this became plain Doi (Kabushiki Kaisha Doi).

Doi provided diverse services, such as professional darkroom work. Retail stores were branded "Camera no Doi" (Kamera no Doi); these were known for the array of used cameras as well as competitive prices of new equipment.

By the 1980s, Doi was as large a presence as Yodobashi Camera in the Nishi-Shinjuku area of west-central Tokyo. Its sales peaked in March 1989. However, it faltered in the 1990s and closed down in 2003. Doi Technical Photo seems to have survived this, even running a photography gallery in Yūrakuchō, but as of 2006, it appears to be defunct.

Notes

The Kimio Doi company a NYC office ( head quarters at 15 East 42nd Street ).
Operationally DOI INC and  DOI U.S.A. INC.
... also 7 hour Photo..!!

Sources

 Asahi Camera editorial staff. Shōwa 10–40nen kōkoku ni miru kokusan kamera no rekishi (Japanese camera history as seen in advertisements, 1935–1965). Tokyo: Asahi Shinbunsha, 1994. . Item 418.
 Hagiya Takeshi. "Makina 67: Ribaibaru shita jabara-kamera" (Makina 67: A bellows camera revival). Chapter 10 of Zunō kamera tanjō: Sengo kokusan kamera jū monogatari (The birth of the Zunow camera: Ten stories of postwar Japanese camera makers). Tokyo: Asahi Sonorama, 1999. 

Consumer electronics retailers of Japan
Defunct retail companies
Defunct companies of Japan
Photographic retailers
Retail companies disestablished in 2003
Photography companies of Japan
Retail companies established in 1949
Retail companies of Japan
Japanese companies established in 1949
Japanese companies disestablished in 2003